Oenaville is an unincorporated community in Bell County, in the U.S. state of Texas. According to the Handbook of Texas, the community had a population of 120 in 2000. It is located within the Killeen-Temple-Fort Hood metropolitan area.

History
Oenaville began when C.D. Johnson opened a store on Big Elm Creek in the late 1860s. A post office was established at Oenaville in 1872. Johnson named the community Oenaville most likely for Oena Griffin. The community had 150 residents served by three churches, two mills and gins, two saloons, and a cooperative association in 1884. Cotton was the most common crop shipped in the community. The population grew to 200 in 1890 and remained there through the 1940s. It returned to 150 residents with five businesses and two churches in 1949. All the businesses closed, and Oenaville reported a population of 120 from 1990 through 2000.

Geography

Education
Oenaville had its own school in 1884 and 1949. Today, the community is served by the Troy Independent School District.

Notable person
 Myron L. Williams, dean of Grubbs Vocational College at the University of Texas at Arlington and a native of Oenaville.

References

Unincorporated communities in Texas
Unincorporated communities in Bell County, Texas